The 2007 British motorcycle Grand Prix was the eighth round of the 2007 MotoGP championship. It took place on the weekend of 22–24 June 2007 at Donington Park in Castle Donington, Great Britain.

MotoGP classification

250 cc classification

125 cc classification

Championship standings after the race (MotoGP)

Below are the standings for the top five riders and constructors after round eight has concluded. 

Riders' Championship standings

Constructors' Championship standings

 Note: Only the top five positions are included for both sets of standings.

References

British motorcycle Grand Prix
British
Motorcycle Grand Prix